Aurea is a Latin female name meaning "golden".  

Aurea may refer to:
 Auria, queen of Pamplona in the 10th century
 Aurea (singer) (born 1987), a Portuguese soul singer
 Aurea of Ostia, 3rd-century Italian martyr
 Áurea Cruz (born 1982), a Puerto Rican volleyball player
 Áurea of San Millán (1043–1070), a Spanish saint
 Aurea, Auburn University golden eagle, flies in stadium before football games

Latin feminine given names